William Tyrrell (31 January 1807 – 24 March 1879) was the first Anglican Bishop of Newcastle, New South Wales.

Early life
Tyrrell was the youngest of 10 children of Timothy Tyrrell, Remembrancer of the City of London. He was educated at the Charterhouse as a day boy, and St John's College, Cambridge, where he graduated in 1831 as fourth senior optime. He had intended studying law, but about the time of his father's death in 1832 he decided to enter the Church, and was ordained deacon in September 1832 and priest a year later. He was curate at Aylestone, near Leicester for about six years, was for a few months at Burnham, near Maidenhead, and in 1839 became rector of Beaulieu in Hampshire.

Bishopdom 
In 1847 Tyrrell was offered and accepted the position of bishop of the newly created see of Newcastle, Colony of New South Wales. He sailed on 18 September 1847 with two clergymen, seven candidates for ordination, a schoolmaster and schoolmistress, his housekeeper, gardener and groom, with the wife and children of his gardener, 20 in all, and arrived at Sydney on 16 January 1848.

Tyrrell rode over much of it, working unceasingly, yet carefully reserving time every day for study and private devotions. He had no training college for his clergy and spent much time advising and helping the less experienced. In 1858 steps were taken to subdivide the diocese by forming the new Diocese of Brisbane, and by September of that year he had arranged for the provision of £5000 as its endowment fund. Eight years later there was another subdivision when the see of Grafton and Armidale was formed. It was suggested that Tyrrell should go to England to assist in the selection of the first bishop, but he felt that it was his duty to stay in his diocese.

With advancing years he was feeling the strain of his work, and was much exercised about the future of the diocese, the provision of stipends for the clergy, their training and superannuation, and the religious instruction of the young. When he made his will, leaving everything to the diocese, he hoped there would be a large endowment for it.

Tyrrell suffered a stroke in August 1877 leaving him partially paralysed. He died at Morpeth after an operation, on 24 March 1879. He was entombed at St John's Anglican Cemetery in Morpeth. In 1961, Francis De Witt Batty, the 7th Bishop of Newcastle's ashes were interred with Tyrrell.

References

Citations

Sources 

 

1807 births
1879 deaths
Alumni of St John's College, Cambridge
Anglican bishops of Newcastle (Australia)